Cavalier Yachts was a yacht manufacturer in New Zealand, with production in New Zealand and designs also licensed to Australia and Japan. In the 1970s Cavalier were the largest production boat builders in the Southern Hemisphere.

History

Cavalier Yachts was created as a partnership between Peter K Smith and John Salthouse, trading as Salthouse Custom Glass Boats Ltd, later changed to Custom Glass Boats Ltd. They initially produced the successful Cavalier 32 as well as the Coronet Trailer Sailer and the Corsair 36 launch.

Salthouse and Smith amicably parted company with Smith taking the Cavalier Yachts half of the business. Smith introduced two new partners, Pat Sullivan as administrator and accountant, and Grant Bennet as floor and production manager.

At their peak Cavalier Yachts had eleven designs in simultaneous production, and were the largest production boat builders in Australasia. Under pressure from the New Zealand government, a sophisticated fibreglass production unit was developed in Glenfield, Auckland to meet the new health and safety regulations for fiberglass construction.

In 1979, Prime Minister Rob Muldoon introduced a sudden 20% sales tax surcharge to the New Zealand boat-building industry which priced Cavalier out of the international market, leading to cancelled orders and precipitating the collapse of the business.

A receiver was appointed and successfully traded the company out, repaying all of its debts. The business was then purchased by Jim Lawry, who formed Export Yachts Ltd, believing that export was the future for the company, and a number of Cavalier 39s were sent to Australia and the United States.

Models
Cavalier Yachts was one of the New Zealand boat-building industry's early successes, the largest in the southern hemisphere at the time. 170 Cavalier 32s were built, and 84 Cavalier 39s.

The Cavalier 32 enjoyed great success in Half Ton racing throughout the 70's. Peter Smith's own Conquero won the 200 mile South Pacific Half Ton Trophy ocean race, the Leo Bouzaid Memorial 120 mile offshore race in 1974, and sister-ship Petticoats took out the 97 mile offshore race.

The entire range consisted of:
 Cavalier 26
 Cavalier 28
 Cavalier 30 with open transom
 Cavalier 32
 Cavalier 36
 Cavalier 39

References

External links
 Cavalier 28 Association (Australia)
 Review of the Cavalier 32 at sailboat.guide
 Overview and History of the Cavalier 36 at sailboat.guide
 Cav36.com

Boat builders
Defunct companies of New Zealand